Zethner See is a lake in the Mecklenburgische Seenplatte district in Mecklenburg-Vorpommern, Germany. At an elevation of 58.5 m, its surface area is 0.35 km2.

External link

Lakes of Mecklenburg-Western Pomerania